Kawashima Yoshiko (in Chinese 川島芳子) is a 1990 Hong Kong historical drama film directed by Eddie Fong based on the life of Yoshiko Kawashima, a Manchu princess who was brought up as a Japanese and served as a spy in the service of the Japanese Kwantung Army and Manchukuo during the Second World War. Film stars Anita Mui as Kawashima, Andy Lau, Patrick Tse and Derek Yee.

Plot
Yoshiko Kawashima is the 14th princess of Prince Su of the Qing dynasty. In order to revive Manchu culture, Prince Su sent Yoshiko to Japan to be trained as a spy by Naniwa Kawashima, who also deprived Yoshiko of her virginity. Yoshiko was ordered to marry a Mongol prince, although the marriage was a failure. After breaking with Naniwa, Yoshiko went to Shanghai and, with her beauty and leverage, she attaches herself to Japanese general Tanaka Takayoshi and helps Puyi establish Manchukuo in Hsinking. She becomes a commander of a Manchukuo army unit and a Japanese spy, seeking revenge on revolutionaries. But upon seeing her former lover Cloud, who became a revolutionary, being arrested for assassinating Takayoshi, Yoshiko has a change of mind. But a crisis will ensue.

Cast
Anita Mui as Yoshiko Kawashima / Jin Bihui(Kam Bik-fai)
Andy Lau as Fook / Cloud
Patrick Tse as Commander Tanaka Takayoshi
Derek Yee as Amakasu Masahiko/ Wong Ka Hung
Idy Chan as Empress Wan Jung
Lawrence Ng as Lam
Matthew Wong as Ganzhu'erzhabu 'Ganjuurjab'
Ken Lo as Tanaka'a aide
Pau Fong as Advocate Lee (Yoshiko's lawyer)
Kam Piu as Prosecutor at Yoshiko's trial
Tin Ching as Judge at Yoshiko's trial
Sze Mei Yee as Emperor Puyi
Blackie Ko
Wai Ching
Chow Suk Yee as Chizuko (Yoshiko's aide)
Ho Chi Moon as Yoshiko's party guest

Box office
The film grossed HK$11,798,844 at the Hong Kong box office during its theatrical run from 28 July to 23 August 1990 in Hong Kong.

Award nominations
12th Hong Kong Film Awards
Nominated: Best Supporting Actor (Derek Yee)
Nominated: Best Cinematography (Jingle Ma)
Nominated: Best Art Direction (Eddie Mok, Fang Ying)
27th Golden Horse Awards
Nominated: Best Supporting Actor (Andy Lau)

See also
Andy Lau filmography
Anita Mui filmography

External links

Kawashima Yoshiko at Hong Kong Cinemagic

Kawashima Yoshiko Review at sogoodreviews.com

1990 films
1990s biographical films
1990s historical films
1990s war films
1990 drama films
1990s mystery films
1990 action thriller films
Hong Kong drama films
Hong Kong action thriller films
Hong Kong historical films
World War II spy films
1990s Cantonese-language films
World War II films
Films set in Shanghai
Films set in Japan
Films with screenplays by Lilian Lee
1990s Hong Kong films